The improved clinch knot, also known as the Salmon Knot, is a knot that is used for securing a fishing line to the fishing lure, but can also affix fishing line to a swivel, clip, or artificial fly.  This is a common knot used by anglers because of its simple tie and strong hold.  When more pull is being applied, the harder the knot turns into itself, increasing the strength of the connection. It can be used with many kinds of line including mono-filament, fluorocarbon, and braided fishing line.

See also
List of knots

External links

 Video instructions on how to tie the Improved Clinch Knot

 ABoK See page 52 for knot description.

Fishing knots